Charlotte Blake Brown (1846 – April 19, 1904) was an American physician. She was one of the first female doctors to practice on the West Coast of the United States and was a co-founder of the San Francisco Hospital for Children and Training School for Nurses.

Biography
Charlotte Amanda Blake was born in Philadelphia, in 1846. Both her parents were from Brewer, Maine, and Charlotte was subsequently sent to attend high school in Bangor, Maine while living with relatives.  After that she entered Elmira College in New York, graduating in 1866.  She married Henry Adams Brown, and in 1872 attended the Women's Medical College of Philadelphia, graduating with an MD in 1874.  She moved to San Francisco the following year and founded the Pacific Dispensary for Women and Children with Dr. Martha Bucknell.  A third female physician, Dr. Sara E. Brown, subsequently joined them, and the institution was re-organized as the San Francisco Hospital for Children in 1878.

Brown had lived in California once before.  Her father went to San Francisco at the height of the California Gold Rush in 1849, and the family joined him in 1851.  In 1854 they moved to Chile, where her father (a Presbyterian minister) ran a mission for Scottish miners until 1854, when they returned to Philadelphia.

Brown's first application to join the San Francisco Medical Society was rejected on account of her gender.  In 1876, however, she was one of four women admitted into the California Medical Society, causing the San Francisco physicians to re-consider and grant her membership two years later.

In 1880, Brown and her colleagues organized within their hospital the first nurses' training school on the West Coast.  Brown wrote 18 articles for medical journals in addition to carrying on a busy practice and raised three children, two of whom also became physicians.

Charlotte Blake Brown died in 1904, aged 58 years, in San Francisco.

Children's Hospital merged with another institution to become California Pacific Medical Center in 1991.

References

Bibliography
Edward T. James, Janet Wilson James, and Paul S. Boyer, Notable American Women, 1670-1950, pp. 251–52

1846 births
1904 deaths
Physicians from Philadelphia
Elmira College alumni
Drexel University alumni
American feminists
American women physicians
American non-fiction writers
Bangor High School (Maine) alumni
American women non-fiction writers
19th-century American women writers
Physicians from California